Route 235, commonly called the Cabot Highway branches off from Route 230 at Southern Bay. Both Route 230 and Route 235 head towards Bonavista, Route 230 crossing the Bonavista Peninsula at this point to service towns on the Trinity Bay side of the Peninsula whilst Route 235 stays on the Bonavista Bay side of the Peninsula, going all the way to Cape Bonavista.

Route description

Route 235 begins in Southern Bay at an intersection with Route 230 (Cabot Highway/Discovery Trail). It heads northeast along the coastline of Bonavista Bay to pass through Princeton, Summerville, Plate Cove West, and Plate Cove East. The highway now heads more inland and eastward through rural areas, where it meets a local road leading to Open Hall, Red Cliffe, and Tickle Cove. Route 235 rejoins the coast at King's Cove, where it meets a local road leading to Duntara and Keels. It winds its way eastward to pass through Stock Cove, where it has an intersection with Route 236 (Stock Cove Road), Knight's Cove, Hodderville, and Amherst Cove, where it has an intersection with Route 237 (Blackhead Bay Road). The highway now passes through Newman's Cove and Birchy Cove before entering the Bonavista town limits along John Cabot Drive. It heads north through neighbourhoods before passing through downtown and by the town's harbour, where it has another intersection Route 230 (Confederation Drive). Route 235 becomes Cape Shore Road and passes through more neighbourhoods before leaving Bonavista and passing by Dungeon Provincial Park. The highway now heads through rural plains to the very tip of the Bonavista Peninsula at Cape Bonavista, where Route 235 comes to a dead end at the Cape Bonavista Lighthouse.

Major intersections

Attractions along Route 235

Dungeon Provincial Park
Cape Bonavista Lighthouse

References

235